Vyshneve is a city  south of Kyiv in Ukraine. It is in Bucha Raion of Kyiv Oblast. Vyshneve hosts the administration of Vyshneve urban hromada, one of the hromadas of Ukraine. It has a population of

History
In 1886, a railway station was built on this site; at the time, the nearest settlement was the village of Zhuliany (Ukrainian Жуляни), so the railway station was given the name "Zhuliany" after the village. In 1912, people started settling around the station.

During the Russian Civil War (1917–1921) the Red and White armies fought here. The population increased during the times of Joseph Stalin's forced collectivization policies (1928–1940), when peasants were settled near the station.

During World War II, Vyshneve became a battlefield. Soviet and German troops fought there until 8 August 1941. After the war, 365 inhabitants received awards for glory and heroism.

Between 1946–1956 the modern town of Vyshneve was built. A school was opened, a town council was formed and new streets were constructed. By 1960 the population had reached 4000. In 1971 the settlement of Vyshneve was officially proclaimed by the Ukrainian Higher Council (parliament) as a town.

Vyshneve's population was 34,465 at the time of the 2001 Ukrainian census. The town has four schools, five kindergartens, a cinema, a clinic, two churches, a hospital and other elements of a modern town.

The chairman of the city is Illya Dikov.

Until 18 July 2020, Vyshneve belonged to Kyiv-Sviatoshyn Raion. The raion was abolished that day as part of the administrative reform of Ukraine, which reduced the number of raions of Kyiv Oblast to seven. The area of Kyiv-Sviatoshyn Raion was split between Bucha, Fastiv, and Obukhiv Raions, with Vyshneve being transferred to Bucha Raion.

Gallery

References

 
Cities in Kyiv Oblast
Cities of district significance in Ukraine
Bucha Raion
Railway towns in Ukraine
Kyiv metropolitan area